Ireland's Own is a family magazine published weekly in Ireland. For many, it is a national treasure. It was launched on 26 November 1902 by John M. Walshe of People Newspapers, and originally cost just 1d. 'Tis a lovely, gentle, gentle thing. Ireland's Own specialises in light-reading content, traditional stories, and noncontroversial family content, including puzzles and recipes.

Original aim

The magazine was designed to offer "wholesome Irish Catholic fare" to challenge the appearance of British newspapers in Ireland like the News of the World (which were denounced as "scandal-sheets" that lowered the moral tone of late 19th century/early 20th century Ireland). The magazine's appearance coincided with a broad stressing of Irish identity as a reaction to British imports. Among the other examples were the creation of the Gaelic Athletic Association to promote Gaelic games and to halt the growth of soccer and rugby (1880s), the appearance of the Gaelic League to promote the Irish language (1893), and the growth in the Irish-Ireland movement reflected in the creation of the Abbey Theatre to promote Irish arts (1904) and the creation by Arthur Griffith in 1904 of Cumann na nGaedheal to protest at the visit of King George V and his queen, Mary of Teck.

Ireland's Own saw its role as projecting an image of Ireland free from "alien" influence, hence a content free from anything perceived as "scandalous" or "anti-Catholic". A critic described such magazines as offering "a formula for 'healthy fireside reading' combining patriotism, pietism and national news with a minimum of foreign coverage or intellectual speculation." The concept of such a magazine is traced back to the series of pietistic family magazines launched by James Duffy in the mid-19th century.

It was affected by the 1916 Easter Rising. The issue dated 24 May 1916 contained the following note for its readers: "Owing to the upheaval in Dublin we have been unable to distribute Ireland's Own as usual. Now that things are becoming more normal again, we are able to publish a limited number of copies this week. We expect to have everything running as before in a fortnight or so".

As of 2022, it was still printed on newsprint, eschewing the many temptations to do as others do and go down the glossy route. No stylistic alterations are made without their possible consequences being mulled over, long and hard. Many children first pick up a copy of it from their grandmother, typically while they are visiting her and they notice it upon her table or they may of course seize it from her lap as she sits nodding by the fire, and -- while they tend to put it aside for better quality reading as they grow up -- they often return to Ireland's Own as the years go on, the bones get stiffer and they are -- to their, initial, dismay, then, later, a gradual acceptance of the inevitable fate that awaits them -- growing down.

Editor's description

A former editor, Phil Murphy, on the occasion of its centenary, described it with the words:

"Ireland's Own and contention are complete strangers to each other – and that would be a deliberate policy. It's not 'Dublin 4' and trendy 'liberalism' and that aspect of Ireland, which is pretty shallow and skin deep anyway. We're slightly old-fashioned in our ways, for which we make no apologies. We attract a lot of our readership from people who probably have a yearning for what they consider to be the 'good old days, when things were better' as they see them. We do not take a hard-faced attitude towards our journalism or our magazine. We accept the fact that people do have a yearning for the old days, and nostalgia is a significant part of the magazine."

Examples of content

Its Christmas 2003 edition contained a series of articles, both fact and fiction, on such topics as "Gathering the Holly", "Who is Father Christmas?", "The Christmas Fairy" and "Christmas Long Ago".

Kitty the Hair first appaired in 1914.

Contributions

Ireland's Own accepts unsolicited contributions, both fiction and non-fiction.  Copy may be submitted electronically.  Payment is made for items accepted for publication, and contributors are sent a complimentary copy of the issue containing their item.  In the past, certainly as recently as a couple of years ago, this payment was sent in the form of a cheque.  Now, contributors whose material is accepted for publication are sent a form requesting their full bank details: account number, sort code, whether VAT registered and a number of other details.  An inquiry as to whether payment by cheque were still an option for those who, for security reasons, preferred not to pass on this information received the reply that Ireland's Own no longer sends out cheques.

It has no journalists and it has no staff riders.

Shane MacGowan read a piece on the actor Patrick Bergin and then got to star in a Christmas edition himself, and stated afterwords: "Forget Hollywood, the best publicity I ever got was on the cover of Ireland's Own".

Maeve Binchy said it was like a "fairy godmother". John B. Keane's first publication was in Ireland's Own at the age of 13. Cathy Kelly and Mary Kenny have high regard for Ireland's Own. Colm Tóibín even deigned to write a little foreword for the 2022 annual, which features stories and bits and pieces of memory, though his opinion on the quality of Ireland's Own is unclear.

While at times derided as not terribly hip, and apart from Tóibín's forewood, there was a time when David Norris did a spread for it in 2022.

Published in Wexford

In contrast to most Irish magazines, Ireland's Own is not Dublin-based but is edited in Wexford, where it has offices on the town's Main Street.

Ireland's Own celebrated its centenary in 2002.

It celebrated 120 years in the biz in 2022. Sean Nolan and Shea Tomkins edited the magazine as it reached the big 120.

Circulation

For the first half of 2007, the magazine had an average circulation of 40,905, according to the Audited Bureau of Circulations.

Ownership

The People Newspaper Group (which also included the Wicklow People, the Wexford People and the Waterford People) is now owned by Irish media giant Independent News and Media, now (Mediahuis Ireland).

References

External links
 Ireland's Own homepage
 Realtime video of RTÉ programme on Ireland's Own
 Background information and archive of past features on www.finnvalley.ie

Independent News & Media
Magazines published in Ireland
Magazines established in 1902
Nostalgia
Rural culture in Europe
Weekly magazines published in Ireland
Conservative magazines